Chicago Solo is an album by the British jazz saxophonist Evan Parker, recorded in 1995 and released on Okka Disk. After eight records of solo soprano saxophone, it was his first unaccompanied tenor sax record.

Reception

In his review for AllMusic, Thom Jurek states: "This is a fascinating and very listening disc of solo improvisations, one that is likely never to find a wide enough audience for its brilliant accomplishment on tenor saxophone."

The Penguin Guide to Jazz describes the results of his first full programme of tenor playing as "extraordinary, music of intense focus and a fearsome weight and intensity of tone."

Track listing
All compositions by Evan Parker
 "Chicago Solo [12]"  – 1:44
 "Chicago Solo [3]"  – 4:40
 "Chicago Solo [4] for Chris McGregor"  – 3:18
 "Chicago Solo [5]"  – 6:56
 "Chicago Solo [6]"  – 3:20
 "Chicago Solo [7]"  – 5:13
 "Chicago Solo [8] for Lee Konitz"  – 2:57
 "Chicago Solo [9]"  – 2:15
 "Chicago Solo [10]"  – 4:46
 "Chicago Solo [11] for Mr. Braxton"  – 1:44
 "Chicago Solo [13]"  – 4:04
 "Chicago Solo [14]"  – 5:26
 "Chicago Solo [15]"  – 4:23
 "Chicago Solo [16] for George Lewis"  – 8:34

Personnel
Evan Parker – tenor sax

References

1997 albums
Evan Parker albums
Okka Disk albums